Arvydas Nekrošius (born 10 March 1984) is a Lithuanian engineer energetic, technology Ph.D., a politician. He is a Member of the Seimas for Raseiniai - Kėdainiai constituency and Deputy Speaker of the Seimas.

References

1984 births
Living people
People from Raseiniai
Members of the Seimas
Lithuanian Farmers and Greens Union politicians
Vytautas Magnus University Agriculture Academy alumni
21st-century Lithuanian politicians